is a Japanese film directed by Ryosuke Hashiguchi, starring Yoshihiko Hakamada and Masashi Endō. It was released in 1993.

It was shot on 16 millimeter film with a small budget and no payment for the actors or the director. It was awarded a PFF Scholarship (which supports the production of one film for theatrical release each year). It was then screened in Berlin Film Festival.

Plot  
Tatsuru and Shinichirō are two young male hustlers in Japan. The older one, Tatsuru, disconnects himself from his emotions in order to perform his job. The younger Shinichirō, meanwhile, grows uncomfortable with the work once he has fallen in love with Tatsuru. After Shinichirō gets thrown out of his parents' house, he stays at Tatsuru's apartment, and their once casual relationship awkwardly develops into something else.

Cast
 Yoshihiko Hakamada as Tatsuru Shimamori
 Masashi Endō as Shinichirō Miyajima
 Reiko Kataoka as Yoriko Suzuki
 Sumiyo Yamada as Atsumi
 Kōji Satō as Master
 Bunmei Harada as Kawakubo
 Kōta Kusano as Takashi
 Yōichi Kawaguchi as Ōta
 Hiroshi Okōchi as Customer
 Tarō Ishida as Yoriko's Father
 Wakaba Irie as Yoriko's Mother

Reception

Reaction in Japan 
The film was a commercial success, surprising given its subject matter. It was nothing less than a breakthrough for real life gay-oriented films in Japan, as well as Okoge (1992) and Kira kira Hikaru (also known as Twinkle) in 1992. The film also introduced the word 'gay' into Japanese society.

References

External links 
 

1993 films
Films directed by Ryōsuke Hashiguchi
1990s Japanese-language films
Japanese LGBT-related films
Gay-related films
1993 LGBT-related films
1990s Japanese films